Molodizhne is an urban-type settlement in Kropyvnytskyi Raion of Kirovohrad Oblast in Ukraine. It is located on the left bank of the Berezivka, a left tributary of the Inhul in the basin of the Southern Bug. Molodizhne belongs to Dolynska urban hromada, one of the hromadas of Ukraine. Population: 

Until 18 July 2020, Molodizhne belonged to Dolynska Raion. The raion was abolished in July 2020 as part of the administrative reform of Ukraine, which reduced the number of raions of Kirovohrad Oblast to four. The area of Dolynska Raion was merged into Kropyvnytskyi Raion.

Economy

Transportation
The closest railway station is in Dolynska, about southeast of the settlement, with connections to Kryvyi Rih, Mykolaiv, and Znamianka. There is some passenger traffic.

The settlement is connected by road with Dolynska and with Ustynivka, with further connections to Kryvyi Rih, Kropyvnytskyi, Mykolaiv, and Odessa.

References

Urban-type settlements in Kropyvnytskyi Raion